The Senate Foreign Relations Subcommittee on Europe and Regional Security Cooperation is one of seven subcommittees of the Senate Foreign Relations Committee.

Jurisdiction
The subcommittee deals with all matters concerning U.S. relations with the countries in Europe and the European Union, the North Atlantic Treaty Organization, and regional intergovernmental organizations like the Organization for Security and Cooperation in Europe (except the states of Central Asia that are within the jurisdiction of the Subcommittee on Near Eastern and South Asian Affairs).  This subcommittee's regional responsibilities include all matters within the geographic region, including matters relating to: (1) terrorism and non-proliferation; (2) crime and illicit narcotics; (3) U.S. foreign assistance programs; and (4) the promotion of U.S. trade and exports.

In addition, this subcommittee has global responsibility for regional security cooperation.

Members, 117th Congress

See also
United States House Foreign Affairs Subcommittee on Europe

External links
Senate Committee on Foreign Relations
Senate Foreign Relations Committee Subcommittees and jurisdictions

Foreign Relations Senate African Affairs